Shahrisabz District is a district of Qashqadaryo Region in Uzbekistan. The capital lies at the city Shahrisabz, itself not part of the district. The district consists of 13 urban-type settlements (Miroqi, Qumqishloq, Oʻrtaqoʻrgʻon, Chorshanbe, Temirchi, Yangiqishloq, Qutchi, Shamaton, Ammogʻon-1, Qoʻshqanot, Anday, Xoʻjaxuroson, Keldihayot) and 12 rural communities.

References

Qashqadaryo Region
Districts of Uzbekistan